Red River State Recreation Area is part of the Greater Grand Forks Greenway and is located in the city of East Grand Forks, Minnesota on the banks of the Red River of the North and the Red Lake River. It was built as a natural buffer as a direct response to the 1997 Red River flood. 

The State Recreation Area is owned and managed by the Minnesota Department of Natural Resources.

External links
Red River State Recreation Area

1997 establishments in Minnesota
Greater Grand Forks
Protected areas established in 1997
Protected areas of Polk County, Minnesota
State parks of Minnesota
1997 Red River flood
Red River of the North